The 1959 Lamar Tech Cardinals football team represented Lamar State College of Technology—now known as Lamar University—as a member of the Lone Star Conference (LSC) during the 1959 NCAA College Division football season. Led by seventh-year head coach James B. Higgins, the Cardinals compiled an overall record of 8–3 with a mark of 4–3 in conference play conference, tying for third place in the LSC.

Schedule

References

Lamar Tech
Lamar Cardinals football seasons
Lamar Tech Cardinals football